Evapotranspiration (ET) is the combined processes by which water moves from the earth’s surface into the atmosphere. It covers both water evaporation (movement of water to the air directly from soil, canopies, and water bodies) and transpiration (movement of water from the soil, through roots and bodies of vegetation, on leaves and then into the air). Evapotranspiration is an important part of the local water cycle and climate, and measurement of it plays a key role in agricultural irrigation and water resource management.

Definition 
Evapotranspiration is a combination of evaporation and transpiration, measured in order to better understand crop water requirements, irrigation scheduling, and watershed management. The two key components of evapotranspiration are:

 Evaporation: the movement of water directly to the air from sources such as the soil and water bodies. It can be affected by factors including heat, humidity, and wind speed.
 Transpiration: the movement of water from root systems, through a plant, and exit into the air as water vapor. This exit occurs through stomata in the plant. Rate of transpiration can be influenced by factors including plant type, soil type, weather conditions and water content, and also cultivation practices.

Evapotranspiration is typically measured in millimeters of water per a set unit of time. Globally, it is estimated that on average between three-fifths and three-quarters of land precipitation is returned to the atmosphere via evapotranspiration.

Factors that impact evapotranspiration levels

Primary factors 
Because evaporation and transpiration occur when water moves into the air, levels of evapotranspiration in a given area are primarily controlled by:

 the amount of water present;
 the amount of energy present in the air and soil (e.g. heat); and
 the ability of the atmosphere to take up water (humidity).

Secondary factors

Vegetation type 
Vegetation type impacts levels of evapotranspiration. For example:

 Herbaceous plants generally transpire less than woody plants, because they usually have less extensive foliage.
 Plants with deep reaching roots can transpire water more constantly, because those roots can pull more water into the plant and leaves.
 Conifer forests tend to have higher rates of evapotranspiration than deciduous broadleaf forests, particularly in the dormant winter and early spring seasons, because they are evergreen.

Vegetation coverage 
Transpiration is a larger component of evapotranspiration (relative to evaporation) in vegetation-abundant areas. As a result, denser vegetation, like forests, may increase evapotranspiration and reduce water yield. 

Two exception to this are cloud forests and rainforests. In cloud forests, trees collect the liquid water in fog or low clouds onto their surface, which eventually drips down to the ground. These trees still contribute to evapotranspiration, but often collect more water than they evaporate or transpire. In rainforests, water yield is increased (compared to cleared, unforested land in the same climatic zone) as evapotranspiration increases humidity within the forest (a portion of which condenses and returns quickly as precipitation experienced at ground level as rain). The density of the vegetation blocks sunlight and reduces temperatures at ground level (thereby reducing losses due to surface evaporation), and reduces wind speeds (thereby reducing the loss of airborne moisture). The combined effect results in increased surface stream flows and a higher ground water table whilst the rainforest is preserved. Clearing of rainforests frequently leads to desertification as ground level temperatures and wind speeds increase, vegetation cover is lost or intentionally destroyed by clearing and burning, soil moisture is reduced by wind, and soils are easily eroded by high wind and rainfall events.

Soil and irrigation 

In areas that are not irrigated, actual evapotranspiration is usually no greater than precipitation, with some buffer and variations in time depending on the soil's ability to hold water. It will usually be less because some water will be lost due to percolation or surface runoff. An exception is areas with high water tables, where capillary action can cause water from the groundwater to rise through the soil matrix back to the surface. If potential evapotranspiration is greater than the actual precipitation, then soil will dry out until conditions stabilize, unless irrigation is used.

Measurement of evapotranspiration

Direct measurement 

Evapotranspiration can be measured directly with a weighing or pan lysimeter. A lysimeter continuously measures the weight of a plant and associated soil, and any water added by precipitation or irrigation. The change in storage of water in the soil is then modeled by measuring the change in weight. When used properly, this allows for precise measurement of evapotranspiration over small areas.

Indirect estimation 
Because atmospheric vapor flux is difficult or time consuming to measure directly, evapotranspiration is typically estimated by one of several different methods that do not rely on direct measurement.

Catchment water balance 
Evapotranspiration may be estimated by evaluating the water balance equation for a given area:. The water balance equation relates the change in water stored within the basin (S) to its input and outputs:

In the equation, the change in water stored within the basin (ΔS) is related to precipitation (P)(water going into the basin), and evapotranspiration (ET), streamflow (Q), and groundwater recharge (D)(water leaving the basin). By rearranging the equation, ET can be estimated if values for the other variables are known:

Energy balance
A second methodology for estimation is by calculating the energy balance.

where λE is the energy needed to change the phase of water from liquid to gas, Rn is the net radiation, G is the soil heat flux and H is the sensible heat flux. Using instruments like a scintillometer, soil heat flux plates or radiation meters, the components of the energy balance can be calculated and the energy available for actual evapotranspiration can be solved.

The SEBAL and METRIC algorithms solve the energy balance at the earth's surface using satellite imagery. This allows for both actual and potential evapotranspiration to be calculated on a pixel-by-pixel basis. Evapotranspiration is a key indicator for water management and irrigation performance. SEBAL and METRIC can map these key indicators in time and space, for days, weeks or years.

Estimation from meteorological data 
Given meteorological data like wind, temperature, and humidity, reference ET can be calculated. The most general and widely used equation for calculating reference ET is the Penman equation. The Penman–Monteith variation is recommended by the Food and Agriculture Organization and the American Society of Civil Engineers. The simpler Blaney–Criddle equation was popular in the Western United States for many years but it is not as accurate in wet regions with higher humidity. Other equations for estimating evapotranspiration from meteorological data includes the Makkink, which is simple but must be calibrated to a specific location, and lastly the Hargreaves equations. 

To convert the reference evapotranspiration to the actual crop evapotranspiration, a crop coefficient and a stress coefficient must be used.  Crop coefficients as used in many hydrological models usually change along the year to accommodate to the fact that crops are seasonal and, in general, plants behave differently along the seasons: perennial plants mature over multiple seasons, while annuals do not survive more than a few, so stress responses can significantly depend upon many aspects of plant type and condition.

Potential evapotranspiration 

Potential evapotranspiration (PET) is the amount of water that would be evaporated and transpired by a specific crop, soil or ecosystem if there were sufficient water available. It is a reflection of the energy available to evaporate or transpire water, and of the wind available to transport the water vapor from the ground up into the lower atmosphere and away from the initial location. Often a value for the potential evapotranspiration is calculated at a nearby climatic station on a reference surface, conventionally on land dominated by short grass (though may differ from station to station). This value is called the reference evapotranspiration (ET0). Actual evapotranspiration is said to equal potential evapotranspiration when there is ample water existent. Evapotranspiration can never be greater than potential evapotranspiration, but can be lower if there is not enough water to be evaporated or plants are unable to transpire maturely and readily.

Potential evapotranspiration is higher in the summer, on clearer and less cloudy days, and closer to the equator, because of the higher levels of solar radiation that provides the energy (heat) for evaporation. Potential evapotranspiration is also higher on windy days because the evaporated moisture can be quickly moved from the ground or plant surface before it precipitates, allowing more evaporation to fill its place.

Potential evapotranspiration is expressed in terms of a depth of water or soil moisture percentage, and can be graphed during the year (see figure).

Potential evapotranspiration is usually measured indirectly, from other climatic factors, but also depends on the surface type, such as free water (for lakes and oceans), the soil type for bare soil, and also the density and diversity of vegetation. Often a value for the potential evapotranspiration is calculated at a nearby climate station on a reference surface, conventionally on short grass (see above).  This value is called the reference evapotranspiration, and can be converted to a potential evapotranspiration by multiplying with a surface coefficient.  In agriculture, this is called a crop coefficient.  The difference between potential evapotranspiration and the actual precipitation is used in irrigation scheduling.

Average annual potential evapotranspiration is often compared to average annual precipitation, the symbol of which is P. The ratio of the two, P/PET, is the aridity index. A humid subtropical climate is a zone of climate characterized by hot and humid summers, and cold to mild winters. Subarctic regions have short, mild summers and freezing winters, falling between 50°N and 70°N latitude, depending on local climates. Precipitation and evapotranspiration is low (compared to warmer variants), and vegetation is characteristic of the coniferous/taiga forest.

List of remote sensing based evapotranspiration models 

 ALEXI
 BAITSSS
 METRIC
 Abtew Method
 SEBAL
 SEBS
 SSEBop

See also
 Eddy covariance flux (aka eddy correlation, eddy flux)
 Hydrology (agriculture)
 Hydrologic Evaluation of Landfill Performance (HELP)
 Latent heat flux
 Water Evaluation And Planning system (WEAP)
 Soil plant atmosphere continuum
 Deficit irrigation
 Evaporation
 Transpiration
 Precipitation
 Biotic pump

References

External links
New Mexico Eddy Covariance Flux Network (Rio-ET)
Texas Evapotranspiration Network
Use and Construction of a Lysimeter to Measure Evapotranspiration
Washoe County (NV) Et Project
US Geological Survey

Hydrology
Agrometeorology
Ecological processes
Irrigation
Water conservation
Water and the environment
Meteorological phenomena